Håvard Nybø (born 11 April 1983) is a Norwegian former professional racing cyclist.

Major results
2004
 1st  Road race, National Under-23 Road Championships
2006
 1st Stage 2 Ringerike GP
2009
 1st Rogaland Grand Prix

References

External links

1983 births
Living people
Norwegian male cyclists
21st-century Norwegian people